Jeypore is a Vidhan Sabha constituency of Koraput district, Odisha.

This constituency includes Jeypore, Jeypore block, 19 Gram panchayats (BB.Singpur, Benagam, Bodigam, Borigumma, Champapadar, Gujuniguda, Gumuda, Haridaguda, Hordali, Kamta, Katharagada, Kumuli, Munja, Narigam, Nuagam, Ranaspur, Sargiguda, Semolaguda and Benasur) of Borigumma block.

In 2014 election, Congress party candidate Tara Prasad Bahinipati  defeated incumbent Biju Janata Dal candidate Rabi Narayan Nanda.

In 2019 election, Congress party candidate Tara Prasad Bahinipati retained his seat after a close contest between Congress , BJD and BJP.

Elected Members

Fourteen elections were held between 1951 and 2014.
Elected members from the Jeypore constituency are:
 2019: (143): Tara Prasad Bahinipati (Congress)
 2014: (143): Tara Prasad Bahinipati (Congress)
2009: (143): Rabi Narayan Nanda (BJD)
2004: (89): Rabi Narayan Nanda (BJD)
2000: (89): Rabi Narayan Nanda (BJD)
1995: (89): Raghunath Patnaik (Congress)
1990: (89): Raghunath Patnaik (Congress)
1985: (89): Gupta Prasad Dash (Congress)
1980: (89): Raghunath Patnaik (Congress-I)
1977: (89): Raghunath Patnaik (Congress)
1974: (82): Raghunath Patnaik (Congress)
1971: (82): Pratap Narayan Singh Deo (Swatantra Party)
1967: (4): N. Ramsaseya (Swatantra Party)
1961: (82): Raghunath Patnaik (Congress)
1957: (3): Laichan Nayak (Ganatantra Parishad) and Harihara Mishra  (Ganatantra Parishad)
1951: (4): Laichan Nayak (Ganatantra Parishad) and Harihar Mishra  (Ganatantra Parishad)

2019 Election Result

2014 Election

Summary of results of the 2009 Election

Notes

References

Assembly constituencies of Odisha
Koraput district